Febby Angguni (born 8 July 1991) is an Indonesian badminton player who affiliate with Berkat Abadi Banjarmasin club. Started her career as a member of Djarum club, she was selected to join the national team when she was 14. At the age of 17, she won her first senior international title at the 2008 Malaysia International Challenge.

Achievements

ASEAN University Games 

Women's singles

Asian Junior Championships 
Girls' singles

BWF International Challenge/Series (7 titles, 3 runners-up) 
Women's singles

  BWF International Challenge tournament
  BWF International Series tournament

Performance timeline

National team 
 Junior level

Individual competitions 
 Junior level

 Senior level

References 

1991 births
Living people
Sportspeople from Bandung
Indonesian female badminton players
20th-century Indonesian women
21st-century Indonesian women